Aisha Manzil or Ayesha Manzil is a neighbourhood in the Central Karachi District of Karachi, Pakistan. Aisha Manzil in one of the localities where many ethnic Bengalis live.

There are several ethnic groups including Muhajirs, Sindhis, Kashmiris, Seraikis, Pakhtuns, Balochis, Memons, Bohras, Ismailis, etc. Over 99% of the population is Muslim. The population of Gulberg Town is estimated to be nearly one million.

The places in Aisha Manzil include Dhamthal Sweets, Aisha Manzil Flyover and Agha Khan Nursing Home.
The cinema (cinepax) situated near Aisha Manzil close to the old Arshi Cinema which is no longer operative and has now become a shopping mall. Aisha Manzil is a landmark of Gulberg Subdivision.

References

External links 
 Archived Karachi Website.

Neighbourhoods of Karachi
Gulberg Town, Karachi
Karachi Central District